Alecia Beth Moore Hart (born September 8, 1979), known professionally as Pink (stylized as P!nk), is an American singer, songwriter and actress. She was a member of the girl group Choice. In 1995, LaFace Records saw potential in Pink and offered her a solo recording contract.

Her R&B-influenced debut studio album Can't Take Me Home (2000) was certified double-platinum in the United States and spawned two Billboard Hot 100 top-ten songs: "There You Go" and "Most Girls". She gained further recognition with the collaborative single "Lady Marmalade" from the Moulin Rouge! soundtrack, which topped many charts worldwide. Refocusing her sound to pop rock with her second studio album Missundaztood (2001), the album sold more than 13 million copies worldwide and yielded the international hit songs "Get the Party Started", "Don't Let Me Get Me", and "Just Like a Pill".

Pink's third studio album, Try This (2003), sold significantly less than her previous work, but it earned her the Grammy Award for Best Female Rock Vocal Performance. She returned to the top of record charts with her fourth and fifth studio albums, I'm Not Dead (2006) and Funhouse (2008), which spawned the top-ten entries "Who Knew" and "U + Ur Hand", as well as the number-one single "So What". Pink's sixth studio album, The Truth About Love (2012), was her first Billboard 200 number-one album and spawned her fourth US number-one single, "Just Give Me a Reason". In 2014, Pink recorded a collaborative album, Rose Ave., with Canadian musician Dallas Green under a folk music duo named You+Me. Her next studio albums, Beautiful Trauma (2017) and Hurts 2B Human (2019), both debuted at atop the Billboard 200 chart, with the former becoming the world's third best-selling album of the year.

Pink has been described as “pop royalty” for her distinctive raspy voice and acrobatic stage presence. Pink has sold over 135 million records worldwide (60 million albums and 75 million singles), making her one of the world's best-selling music artists.  Her accolades include three Grammy Awards, two Brit Awards, a Daytime Emmy Award and seven MTV Video Music Awards, including the Michael Jackson Video Vanguard Award. In 2009, Billboard named Pink the Pop Songs Artist of the Decade. Pink was also the second most-played female solo artist in the United Kingdom during the 2000s decade, behind only Madonna. VH1 ranked her at number ten on their list of the 100 Greatest Women in Music, while Billboard awarded her the Woman of the Year award in 2013. At the 63rd annual BMI Pop Awards, she received the BMI President's Award for "her outstanding achievement in songwriting and global impact on pop culture and the entertainment industry."

Early life and family
Alecia Beth Moore was born on September 8, 1979, in Doylestown, Pennsylvania, to emergency room nurse, Judith Moore (née Kugel) and insurance salesman, James Moore. She has described herself as an "Irish-German-Lithuanian-Jew", and identifies as Jewish (her mother is Jewish). Although a healthy baby at birth, she quickly developed asthma that plagued her through her early years. When Pink was a toddler, her parents began having marital problems and divorced before she was 10.

Pink was trained as a competitive gymnast between the ages 4 and 12. She attended Central Bucks High School West. In high school, Pink joined her first band, Middleground, but it disbanded upon losing a Battle of the Bands competition. As a teenager, she wrote lyrics as an outlet for her feelings, and her mother commented, "Her initial writings were always very introspective. Some of it was very black, and very deep, almost worrisome."

Pink began performing in Philadelphia clubs when she was about 14 years old. She adopted her stage name, "Pink," around this time. She has given different explanations about how she came to be given her nickname as a child. At 14, she was convinced to audition to become a member of the all-female group Basic Instinct, and earned a spot in the lineup. Ultimately, the group disbanded without releasing any material.

Career

1995–1998: Career beginnings
At 16, Pink and two other teenage girls, Sharon Flanagan and Chrissy Conway, formed the R&B group Choice. A copy of their first song, "Key to My Heart", was sent to LaFace Records in Atlanta, Georgia, where L.A. Reid overheard it and arranged for the group to fly there so he could see them perform. After that, he signed them to a record deal. Since the three girls were under 18 at the time, their parents had to cosign the contract. The group relocated to Atlanta and recorded an album, which was never released, but "Key to My Heart" appeared on the soundtrack to the 1996 film Kazaam. During a Christmas party, Reid gave Pink an ultimatum: go solo or go home. Choice disbanded in 1998.

1999–2002: Can't Take Me Home and Missundaztood
After Choice disbanded, Pink signed a recording contract with LaFace Records and began working on her debut solo album with producers such as Babyface, Kandi Burruss and Tricky Stewart. Her debut single, "There You Go", was released in February 2000 and became her first top-ten hit on the Billboard Hot 100 chart, where it peaked at number seven. Internationally, the song also charted inside the top ten in Australia, New Zealand, and the United Kingdom. In April, Pink's debut album, Can't Take Me Home, was released to commercial success. It peaked 26 on the Billboard 200 chart, and was certified double platinum by the Recording Industry Association of America (RIAA) for two million units shipped in the United States. It also went platinum in the United Kingdom and multi-platinum in Australia and Canada, while selling over four million copies worldwide. Critical reception to the album was mixed. The album's second single, "Most Girls", peaked at number four on the Billboard Hot 100 and became her first chart-topping single in Australia. "You Make Me Sick" was released as the final single and reached number 33 on the Hot 100.

Pink won the trophy for Female New Artist of the Year at the 2000 Billboard Music Awards. She was billed as a supporting act on the North American leg of NSYNC's No Strings Attached Tour throughout the summer of 2000. In 2001, Pink, alongside singers Christina Aguilera and Mýa as well as rapper Lil' Kim, performed a cover of "Lady Marmalade" for the soundtrack of the film Moulin Rouge!. In the US it became the most successful airplay-only single in history, as well as Pink's first No. 1 single. The success of the single was helped by its music video, which was popular on music channels and won the MTV Video Music Award for Video of the Year. The song won Pink's first Grammy Award for Best Pop Collaboration with Vocals.

Tired of being marketed as another cookie cutter pop act, as well as eager both to be seen as a more serious songwriter and musician and to perform the type of music she wanted to, Pink took her sound in a new direction and sought more artistic or creative control during the recording of her second album, Missundaztood. She recruited Linda Perry, former singer of 4 Non Blondes (one of Pink's favorite groups in her teenage years). Pink moved into Perry's Los Angeles home where the pair spent several months writing songs for the album. Perry co-wrote and co-produced the album with Dallas Austin and Scott Storch, and according to VH1's Driven program, Antonio "LA" Reid of LaFace Records was not initially content with the new music Pink was making. The album, named Missundaztood because of Pink's belief that people had a wrong image of her, was released in November 2001.

"Get the Party Started" was released as the lead single and peaked at number four on the Billboard Hot 100. It also became a worldwide hit, reaching number one in Australia, Ireland, New Zealand, Romania, and Spain, as well as spending four weeks at the top of the European Hot 100 Singles chart. At the 2002 MTV Video Music Awards, its music video won in the categories of Best Female Video and Best Dance Video. The album's other singles—"Don't Let Me Get Me", "Just Like a Pill", and "Family Portrait"—were also radio and chart successes, with "Just Like a Pill" becoming Pink's second number-one hit in the United Kingdom. Missundaztood remains Pink's best-selling record with over 13 million copies sold worldwide. According to the International Federation of the Phonographic Industry (IFPI), Missundaztood was the eighth best-selling album of 2002 globally. Pink won a World Music Award for Best Selling American Pop/Rock Female Artist. She was also nominated for Best Pop Vocal Album and Best Female Pop Vocal Performance at the 45th Grammy Awards. Faith Hill's 2002 album, Cry, features a song co-written by Pink and Perry ("If You're Gonna Fly Away"). In 2002, Pink headlined a tour of America, Europe and Australia, the Party Tour, as well as becoming a supporting act for Lenny Kravitz's American tour. Pink was named the Top Female Billboard 200 Artist of 2002.

2003–2007: Try This and I'm Not Dead

In mid-2003, Pink contributed the song "Feel Good Time" to the soundtrack of the film Charlie's Angels: Full Throttle, in which she had a cameo appearance as a motocross race ramp owner/promoter. Featuring electronic music artist William Orbit, it became Pink's first single to miss the top 40 on Billboards Hot 100 chart, although it was a hit in Europe and in Australia. It was later included on non-US editions of Pink's third album, Try This, which was released on November 11, 2003. Eight of the 13 tracks were co-written with Tim Armstrong of the band Rancid. Linda Perry was featured on the album as a writer and musician. Despite the album reaching the top ten on album charts in the US, in Canada, in the UK, and in Australia, sales were considerably lower than those of Missundaztood. However, it did go platinum in the US. The singles "Trouble" and "God Is a DJ" did not reach the US top 40 but did reach the top ten in other countries, and "Last to Know" was released as a single outside North America. "Trouble" earned Pink the Grammy award in Best Female Rock Vocal Performance category at the 46th Annual Grammy Awards, and "Feel Good Time" was nominated for Best Pop Collaboration with Vocals. She toured extensively on the Try This Tour through Europe and Australia, where the album was better received.

During the same period, Pink co-wrote the song "Take A Picture" with Damon Elliott which was released on Mýa's album Moodring. In 2005, Pink collaborated with Lisa Marie Presley on the track "Shine", released on Presley's second album Now What. Pink took a break to write the songs for her fourth album, I'm Not Dead, which she said she titled as such because "It's about being alive and feisty and not sitting down and shutting up even though people would like you to." Pink worked with producers Max Martin, Billy Mann, Christopher Rojas, Butch Walker, Lukasz Gottwald, and Josh Abraham on the album. The album's release through LaFace Records in April 2006 was a substantial success throughout the world, particularly in Australia. The album reached the top ten in the US, the top five in the UK, No. 1 in Germany, and was No. 1 in Australia for two non-consecutive weeks.

The album's lead single, "Stupid Girls", was Pink's biggest US hit since 2002 and earned her a Grammy Award nomination for Best Female Pop Vocal Performance. Its music video, in which she parodies celebrities such as Lindsay Lohan, Jessica Simpson, Mary-Kate Olsen, and Paris Hilton, won the MTV Video Music Award for Best Pop Video. Subsequent singles "Who Knew" and "U + Ur Hand" were substantial hits in Australia and Europe, and they later became top ten singles in the US. in 2007. The non-US singles were "Nobody Knows", a minor hit in the UK, Australia and Germany; "Dear Mr. President", an open letter to the US President George W. Bush which featured the Indigo Girls and became a No. 1 hit in Belgium as well as a top five hit in Germany, Australia, and other countries; "Leave Me Alone (I'm Lonely)", a UK top 40 and Australian top five entry; and "'Cuz I Can". The album has sold over 1.3 million copies in the US, as well as over 700,000 copies in Australia. The album proved very popular in Australia, with six top five singles and a record-breaking 62 weeks in the top 10; so far the album has gone 10 times platinum.

In support of the album, Pink embarked on the world I'm Not Dead Tour, for which ticket sales in Australia were particularly high; she sold approximately 307,000 tickets in Australia, giving her the record for the biggest concert attendance for an arena tour by a female artist. One of the London shows on the tour was taped and released as a DVD, Pink: Live from Wembley Arena, where she sang Linda Perry's "Whats Up?". In 2006, Pink was chosen to sing the theme song for NBC Sunday Night Football, "Waiting All Day for Sunday Night", which is a take on "I Hate Myself for Loving You" by Joan Jett. She contributed a cover of Rufus's "Tell Me Something Good" to the soundtrack of the film Happy Feet, and lent her name to PlayStation to promote the PSP, a special pink edition of which was released.

Pink collaborated with several other artists in 2006 and 2007, when she opened for Justin Timberlake on the American leg of his FutureSex/LoveShow Tour. She sang on the Indigo Girls album Despite Our Differences. She was featured on India.Arie's song "I Am Not My Hair" from the Lifetime Television film Why I Wore Lipstick to My Mastectomy. She wrote a song, "I Will", for Natalia's third album, Everything and More. "Outside of You", another song she co-wrote, was recorded by dance-pop singer Hilary Duff and released on her 2007 album Dignity. Pink recorded a song with Annie Lennox and twenty-two other female acts for Lennox's fourth solo studio album, Songs of Mass Destruction; titled "Sing", it was written as an anthem for HIV/AIDS, according to Lennox's website. In December 2007, a special edition Pink Box, which comprises her second to fourth albums and the DVD Live in Europe, was released in Australia. It reached the top twenty on the albums chart and was certified Gold, selling over 35,000 units.

2008–2011: Funhouse and Greatest Hits... So Far!!!

On August 7, 2008, Pink's single "So What" was leaked online, and radio stations across Australia were quick to give it massive airplay. Less than six hours after the leak, "So What" was voted No.1 on Nova 100 Melbourne and shot to No.1 on the Today Network's national radio Hot30 Countdown. On August 22, Pink announced a new track, titled "Crystal Ball". On September 18, 2008, "So What" became her second number-one hit on the Billboard Hot 100. Pink was the guest of honor at the 2008 ARIA Music Awards, which were held in Sydney, Australia, in October 2008. There she sang "So What". On November 3, 2008, Funhouse debuted at No. 1 on the ARIA charts. In Australia it sold over 86,000 units in its first week, and was eventually certified eleven times platinum.

On November 23, 2008, Pink performed "Sober", the second single from Funhouse, at the American Music Awards. The third single was "Please Don't Leave Me", with a video directed by Dave Meyers. In Australia, "Bad Influence" was released as the album's fourth single as a promotional single for her Funhouse Tour, and "Funhouse" was later released as the fifth single. However, "Bad Influence" was not released as a single in Europe until March 2010, which was after "Funhouse" had been released. In May 2009, Pink released a four-CD box set of her first four albums; this set peaked at No. 7 in the UK Album Chart. In 2009, Pink performed in The People Speak, a documentary feature film that uses dramatic and musical performances of the letters, diaries, and speeches of everyday Americans, based on historian Howard Zinn's A People's History of the United States.

Pink's Funhouse Tour started in France on February 24, 2009, and continued through Europe until mid-May, with supporting act Raygun. Pink then performed a series of shows in Australia, all of which sold out. Between May and August 2009, she performed for a total of more than 600,000 Australian fans at 58 shows around the country.

On September 13, 2009, Pink performed "Sober" while doing a trapeze act at the 2009 MTV Video Music Awards, where she was nominated for Best Female Video for "So What". On January 31, 2010, Pink did another circus act in the form of aerial silks at the 2010 Grammy Awards, this time performing the song "Glitter in the Air". She received a standing ovation. In 2013, Billboard ranked the performance as the best between 2000 and 2012. Billboard recognized Pink as the Pop Songs Artist of the Decade. According to the BBC countdown compiled by PPL, Pink was the second most-played female solo artist in the United Kingdom during the 2000s decade, behind Madonna.

Pink was a soloist in the remake of the 1985 charity single, "We Are the World". She collaborated on the 2010 Herbie Hancock album, The Imagine Project, in which she sang Peter Gabriel's "Don't Give Up" with John Legend and contributed vocals to John Lennon's "Imagine" with Seal, India.Arie, Jeff Beck, Konono Nº1, Oumou Sangaré, and others. The last collaboration earned Pink a Grammy Award for Best Pop Collaboration with Vocals. She was featured on a track titled "Won't Back Down" for Eminem's 2010 album Recovery; Eminem explained that he included Pink because he "felt like she would smash this record."

On July 15, 2010, during a concert in Nurnberg, Germany, Pink was preparing to end her concert with an aerial acrobatic routine when she was pulled offstage and onto a barricade below. Her left-side flywire had been activated before the right-side one had been properly attached to her harness.  She was taken to a local hospital where it was determined that she had not been seriously injured. Pink sold a total of 3,000,000 concert tickets on her 2009–10 worldwide tour, according to a statement on behalf of UK tour promoter Marshall Arts.

In the first week of October 2010, Pink released "Raise Your Glass", the first single from her first compilation album, Greatest Hits... So Far!!!. The song celebrates a decade since Pink's debut in 2000 and is dedicated to her fans who have been supporting her over the years. The song reached the top of the Billboard Hot 100, becoming Pink's tenth Top 10 hit, and her third number-one on the chart.
She released the compilation album on November 12, 2010, and almost a month later she released the album's second single, named "Fuckin' Perfect". The song reached number two on the Billboard Hot 100, and peaked at number one on the airplay charts in Germany. On the German singles chart, the song entered at number seven in March 2011.

Pink voiced the character of Gloria in Happy Feet Two, which premiered on November 18, 2011, in the United States. She also sings the movie's theme song, "Bridge of Light".

On October 7, 2011, RCA Music Group announced that it would be disbanding Jive Records, along with Arista Records and J Records. With the shutdown, Pink and all other artists previously signed to the labels would release any future material through RCA Records.

2012–2015: The Truth About Love and You+Me

In February 2012, Pink confirmed that she was in the writing process for her next studio album, The Truth About Love. She was scheduled to perform at a fundraiser for the presidential campaign of Barack Obama that June, but had to cancel her performance after she was hospitalized and underwent the removal of her gallbladder. The Truth About Love was preceded with the release of its lead single, "Blow Me (One Last Kiss)", in July. The single peaked at number five on the Billboard Hot 100, while reaching number one in Australia and Hungary, and the top five in Canada, Japan, and the United Kingdom. Released in September, The Truth About Love made its debut atop the Billboard 200 with first-week sales of 281,000, making it her first number-one album in the United States. It also topped the charts in Australia, Austria, Canada, Germany, New Zealand, Sweden, and Switzerland, and became the world's sixth best-selling album of 2012 according to the IFPI. The album was certified double platinum by the RIAA for two million copies shipped and has sold over seven million copies worldwide. The Truth About Love received positive response from music critics and was nominated for Best Pop Vocal Album at the 55th Annual Grammy Awards.

"Try" was released as the second single from The Truth About Love in October 2012 and became a worldwide top-ten hit, peaking at number nine on the Billboard Hot 100. In February 2013, Pink released the fourth single, "Just Give Me a Reason", featuring guest vocals by Nate Ruess of fun. It became the most successful single from The Truth About Love, topping the record charts in more than 20 countries worldwide and becoming Pink's fourth number-one hit on the Billboard Hot 100. According to the IFPI, the song was the fourth best-selling digital single of 2013 with 9.9 million copies sold worldwide. The song won the Billboard Mid-Year Award for Favorite Hot 100 No.1 Song, and garnered two nominations for Best Pop Duo/Group Performance and Song of the Year at the 56th Annual Grammy Awards. Three further singles, "True Love", "Walk of Shame", and "Are We All We Are", was released throughout 2013 to less commercial success. On February 13, 2013, Pink kicked off her sixth tour, known as The Truth About Love Tour, in Phoenix, Arizona. Billboard released a statement on June 14, announcing that Pink held the No. 1 spot on their Hot Tours chart, as the American leg of her Truth About Love Tour grossed over $23.6 million. She still held the title a week later, as the European leg grossed $30.7 million.

In addition to her work for The Truth About Love, Pink appeared on the track "Guns and Roses" on T.I.'s album Trouble Man: Heavy Is the Head. The song has been certified Gold by the ARIA for sales of 35,000 digital downloads shipped in Australia. She also wrote two songs, "I Walk Alone" and "Lie to Me", for Cher's new album, Closer to the Truth. Pink starred as a sex addict alongside Gwyneth Paltrow and Mark Ruffalo in the 2012 movie Thanks for Sharing. The official trailer was released on June 27 and the movie premiered in the United States until September 20, 2013. Her legal name, Alecia Moore, is used for the movie credits. Her role as Dede was heavily praised by critics. rogerebert.com commented on her performance saying "Of all the cast here, the least experienced is the pop singer Pink, yet she does the best acting in the film: natural, a little harsh, a little unstable. Pink, like Macy Gray in her Lee Daniels movie roles, knows instinctively how to behave on camera by just pretending that the camera isn't there."

Billboard named Pink Woman of the Year 2013. In December, the magazine also named The Truth About Love Tour the third best selling tour of 2013 with $147.9 million in ticket sales; falling only behind Bon Jovi and Michael Jackson: The Immortal World Tour. Also in Billboard's end of year charts, Pink was ranked the sixth top artist of 2013 and she scored her highest charting end-of-year song and album; with Just Give Me a Reason sitting at number 7 on the Billboard Hot 100 and The Truth About Love placing at number 8 on the Billboard 200. In Australia, Pink has had an album placed at number one or two in the ARIA End of Year Albums Chart for six out of the past seven years as The Truth About Love topped the chart for two years in a row. She was the ninth top grossing music artist of 2013, with $20,072,072.32 earned. RCA Records later announced that they have signed Pink for a multi-album deal that will last for years to come. The singer was quoted about the deal saying "I am super-duper excited to continue onwards and upwards with RCA and my team there".

It was announced in September 2014, that Pink and Dallas Green, lead singer of City and Colour, worked together on a collaborative album, under the band name You+Me. The album, titled Rose Ave., was released on October 14, 2014. The album debuted at number four on the Billboard 200 and at number one on the US Folk Albums chart.

In August 2015, Pink recorded the theme song for the 13th season of The Ellen DeGeneres Show. The song, "Today's the Day", was performed during the show's premiere week in New York City on September 10, 2015.

2016–2020: Beautiful Trauma, Hurts 2B Human and hiatus 

It was announced in February 2016 that Pink will cover a Beatles song, "Lucy in the Sky with Diamonds", for the upcoming Netflix original series Beat Bugs. In the same month, it was announced that she had recorded a cover of "White Rabbit" for the movie Alice Through the Looking Glass, while in April it was revealed that she contributed the song "Just like Fire" to the soundtrack of the movie. In Australia, it topped the ARIA Charts. The following July, it was announced that Pink had written a song for French-Canadian singer Celine Dion called "Recovering" for inclusion on her upcoming English-language album. Pink provided guest vocals on country singer Kenny Chesney's single "Setting the World on Fire" which was released on August 1, 2016. The single topped on the Billboard Hot Country Songs and went platinum in the United States and Canada. On March 10, 2017, Pink teamed up with Stargate and Australian star Sia on the former's debut single, "Waterfall".

Pink took a break to write songs for her upcoming seventh album. In June 2017, Pink confirmed that she was making her next studio album. On July 17, 2017, she announced via her official Twitter account that the video shoot for the first single will take place the following week. "What About Us", the lead single from Pink's seventh studio album, Beautiful Trauma, was released on August 10, 2017 and reached number one in Australia. The album was released on October 13, 2017, and became the third best-selling album of the year worldwide. On August 27, 2017, Pink received the Michael Jackson Video Vanguard Award at the MTV Video Music Awards. She also performed a medley of some of her hits, including her new single, "What About Us", before accepting the award, which was presented to her by Ellen DeGeneres. "What About Us" reached number one on the Adult Pop Songs chart, earning Pink her ninth leader on the chart, breaking her out of a tie with Katy Perry for the solo female artist with the most number-ones in the chart's history and placing her in second place amongst all acts. The song received one nomination at the 60th Annual Grammy Awards for Best Pop Solo Performance. "Beautiful Trauma" was released on November 21, 2017, as the second single from Beautiful Trauma to less commercial success, reaching top thirty in Australia, the United Kingdom, France, and Scotland. While it only managed to peak at number seventy-eight on the Billboard Hot 100, it topped on the Billboard Dance Club Songs chart. On December 5, 2017, rapper Eminem revealed that Pink would be collaborating on the song "Need Me" for his ninth studio album Revival. The album received the nomination for Best Pop Vocal Album earned Pink's 20th nomination at the Annual Grammy Awards.

Although sick with influenza, Pink sang the US national anthem ahead of Super Bowl LII, a dream she had  since, as a child, seeing Whitney Houston sing at Super Bowl XXV in 1991. On March 1, 2018, Pink started her seventh concert tour, the Beautiful Trauma World Tour, which was scheduled to visit North America and Oceania until September 8, 2018. She later decided to extend the tour until May 2019 including Europe. On April 6, 2018, she was featured on Elton John's Revamp & Restoration, singing the song "Bennie and the Jets", with Elton John himself and Logic.

On April 17, 2018, People teased its 2018 "Most Beautiful" cover star by calling her "a performer, mother and role model whose honesty, humour, confidence and sheer star power make her one of the most beloved and fascinating entertainers on the planet." The next day the magazine revealed the cover, which features Pink with her two kids Willow and Jameson. The magazine issue was named the "beautiful issue". Similar covers had featured Julia Roberts and Jennifer Aniston.
On October 23, 2018, Pink released her version of the song "A Million Dreams" from the upcoming "The Greatest Showman – Reimagined" album, a reworking of the soundtrack with contributions from various artists including Kelly Clarkson, Kesha, Jess Glynne and Missy Elliott. Pink's daughter, Willow Sage Hart is also featured on the album performing the song's reprise.

On February 5, 2019, Pink received a star on the Hollywood Walk of Fame; she further announced the release of her eighth album, Hurts 2B Human, which was released on April 26, 2019. The album's lead single, "Walk Me Home" was released on February 20, 2019. On the release date, Pink performed the song alongside a medley of her biggest hits at the BRIT Awards, including "Try", "Just Give Me a Reason", with Fun. lead singer Nate Ruess, and "What About Us". She was also awarded with the Outstanding Contribution to Music Award at the ceremony. In December 2019, Pollstar named her Artist of the Year. Pink confirmed that in 2020 she will take a break from music to focus on her family.

2021–present: All I Know So Far and Trustfall
On February 12, 2021, she released the song "Cover Me in Sunshine", a duet with her daughter Willow Sage Hart. On April 9, 2021, she released the song "Anywhere Away from Here", a duet with Rag'n'Bone Man. On April 29, she announced a live album, titled All I Know So Far: Setlist, which was released on May 21. The album contains the live versions of previous Pink songs, live covers and "Cover Me in Sunshine". It also includes the title track, released as a single on May 7. All I Know So Far: Setlist serves as the companion album to the documentary film covering Pink's life of the same name, which was released simultaneously with the album through Amazon's Prime Video platform.

In April 2021, Pink confirmed to ET Canada that a ninth studio album was in the "very early days, but I will tell you, it will be very honest".

On November 4, 2022, Pink released the single "Never Gonna Not Dance Again", which serves as the lead single from her upcoming album Trustfall. Pink performed the song at the American Music Awards on November 20.

Artistry

Influences

Pink has named Madonna and Janis Joplin as her biggest musical influences. In a 2000 interview with MTV, Pink said that during her childhood she used to think that she was Madonna's daughter, saying: "I've always been the type of person that followed Madonna like a lost puppy. I didn't speak to my mother for a year, because I was sure she adopted me." She stated, "Madonna has always been an inspiration for me... I was a fan right from the first time I heard 'Holiday'." Pink also won her first talent show singing Madonna's "Oh Father". Of Janis Joplin, Pink said "She was so inspiring by singing blues music when it wasn't culturally acceptable for white women, and she wore her heart on her sleeve. She was so witty and charming and intelligent, but she also battled an ugly-duckling syndrome. I would love to play her in a movie." In a tribute performance on her Try This Tour, Pink called Joplin "a woman who inspired me when everyone else ... didn't!"

As a child, she admired the leader of 4 Non Blondes, Linda Perry, whom she would later track down and form a close relationship with on her second album. She said: Literally this woman spoke to me. Being in pain and being on drugs and being misunderstood and, yeah she spoke my language. Without having to say anything, she could sing a note and it was what I was feeling. I used to sit at three or four o' clock in the morning, tripping on whatever, screaming 4 Non Blondes out the window until the cops were called.

Voice and timbre
Throughout her career, Pink has received acclaim from critics for her powerful singing abilities. Pink is a contralto, whose voice has been described as "raspy", "husky", and "distinctive". NBC News music critic Maura Johnston said that, at times, "the sheer power of her alto" has been overshadowed by her skills as an aerialist. James Montgomery of MTV calls her "a deceptively good singer ... who can out-sing almost anyone". The Guardian describes her voice as "prodigious". Ann Powers of the Los Angeles Times labeled her "a powerhouse vocalist". Pink has also been noted for her "raw", "soulful" voice and her ability to emote. The Inquirer defined her voice as "husky" and "gutsy", further complimenting her for developing into a "powerfully emotive vocalist", while comparing her to Janis Joplin. The Star Tribune commends her by writing, "Her slightly raspy, slightly soulful voice made you feel the dysfunction in 'Family Portrait', the longing of 'Who Knew' and the empowerment in 'Perfect'." CNN has said that Pink is known for singing "with the right level of emotion". Fellow artist Kelly Clarkson has called Pink's voice "the best of our generation". Troy L. Smith, writing for Cleveland.com, called Pink one of her generation's most underrated vocalists, writing that she is capable of "sing[ing] anything, from rock and pop to folk and R&B." Smith named her 2006's second best vocalist, runner-up to Carrie Underwood.

Public image
Aside from her music, Pink has been noted for her fashion style, such as the "adventurous" hairstyles she has worn, which have ranged from fluorescent spikes to pink-streaked dreadlocks to a pitch-black skater cut. Regarding her style, she told InStyle, "I'm eclectic. I'm a tomboy, but I'm kind of a hippie and kind of a gangster ... I don't know if that's a good thing, but it is my thing."

Pink is an animal-rights activist and a prominent campaigner for PETA, contributing her voice toward causes such as the protest against KFC. In conjunction with PETA, she criticized the Australian wool industry over its use of mulesing. In January 2007, she stated that she had been misled by PETA about mulesing and that she had not done enough research before lending her name to the campaign. Her campaigning led to a headlining concert called PAW (Party for Animals Worldwide) in Cardiff, Wales, on August 21, 2007. In 2015, she posed nude for PETA's "I'd Rather Go Naked Than Wear Fur" campaign.

Pink is also outspoken about LGBT rights and supports same-sex marriage. In October 2012, Pink told The Advocate that she does not define her sexual orientation saying, "I never felt the need to."

Pink is also involved with several charities, including Human Rights Campaign, ONE Campaign, The Prince's Trust, New York Restoration Project, Run for the Cure Foundation, Save the Children, Take Back the Night, UNICEF and World Animal Protection.  Pink has been officially recognized as an advocate for RSPCA Australia. On February 16, 2009, Pink announced she was donating $250,000 to the Red Cross Bushfire Appeal to aid the victims of the bushfires that swept through the Australian state of Victoria earlier that month. Pink stated that she wanted to make "a tangible expression of support". Pink also donated money to Autism Speaks. In July 2021, she offered to pay the fines handed out to the Norwegian women's beach handball team, after they wore shorts like their male counterparts instead of bikini bottoms.

In August 2012, Pink became a spokesmodel for CoverGirl, featuring in a fall 2013 advertising campaign themed "beauty with an edge".

On August 21, 2018, Pink stopped her concert in Brisbane for a grieving fan. A girl named Leah lost her mother one month prior to the concert, and she and her family hung up signs all around the concert, saying "My name is Leah – I'm 14 years old. I lost my beautiful Mum last month. I would LOVE a hug... Please!" The signs grabbed the attention of Pink.

Legacy

Pink has been credited for breaking boundaries and pushing the envelope throughout her career. She is regarded as the "most trailblazing artist" of her pop generation. Robert Hilburn of the Los Angeles Times says, "Pink stood up for her music, broke the music industry's mold and scored a breakout hit, challenging a school of teen singers to find their own sounds as well." He adds, "[Pink] also started a race among other teen pop stars like Christina Aguilera to add substance to their own sound." Ann Powers refers to her as a "powerhouse vocalist", stating her mix of rebellion, emotional rawness, humor, and "infectious" dance beats created "a model for the mashup approach of latter-day divas such as Katy Perry, Kesha, and Rihanna." Rob Sheffield of Rolling Stone commented: "I think people respond to her sense of independence and dedication. It inspires people... This is a prolific pop artist who is sometimes famous and successful, sometimes obscure, who nonetheless keeps making her own kind of music."

James Montgomery of MTV describes her as "a fabulously fearless pop artist" who can "out-sing almost anyone out there. She can out-crazy Gaga or Lily. She's the total pop-star package, everything you'd want in a singer/entertainer/icon. And still, she remains oddly off the radar. Such is the price of busting borders". Entertainment Weekly said: "She essentially invented the whole modern wave of Pop Diva Domination: You can draw a straight line from "Get This Party Started" to Katy Perry, Kesha, pre-messianic Lady Gaga, and post-weird Rihanna."  Glamour Magazine wrote: "When Pennsylvania-born Alecia Moore debuted in 2000, pop was dominated by long-locked blonds like Britney Spears, Christina Aguilera and Jessica Simpson. Pink changed the game. Without her, the last 13 years of big-voiced, tough chick music is hard to imagine."

Following her performance at the American Music Awards of 2012, LZ Granderson of CNN wrote: ... our culture's biggest sin may well be the auto-tuned syrup we've allowed to dominate the pop charts. All-time chart records are handed to vacuous acts such as the Black Eyed Peas and singing awards are given to vocal lightweights such as Taylor Swift [...] But thank God for Pink. [...]  While Christina Aguilera has a tendency to oversing, Britney Spears can't sing, and Lauryn Hill sorta stopped singing, Pink has managed to carve a brilliant 13-year career by being something that is incredibly rare these days—an artist.
British soul singer Adele considers Pink's performance at Brixton Academy in London as one of "the most defining moments" in her life, saying "It was the Missundaztood record, so I was about 13 or 14. I had never heard, being in the room, someone sing like that live. I remember sort of feeling like I was in a wind tunnel, her voice just hitting me. It was incredible."

Pink's work has inspired many other artists, including Christina Aguilera, Demi Lovato, Kelly Clarkson, Katy Perry, Tegan and Sara, Ashley Tisdale, Alessia Cara, Victoria Justice, Adele, Julia Michaels, Ben Hopkins of Pwr Bttm Dua Lipa, Bebe Rexha, Halsey, Anne Marie, Kehlani, and Daya.

Personal life
Pink met professional motocross racer Carey Hart at the 2001 X Games in Philadelphia. Following a brief separation in 2003, Pink proposed to Hart in June 2005 during a Mammoth Lakes motocross race; she was "assisting" in his race and wrote "Will You Marry Me? I'm serious!" on a pit board. He initially did not notice and continued on for another lap. When he did notice later, he veered off the track to accept right then. She then made him finish the race. They married in Costa Rica on January 7, 2006.

After months of speculation, Pink announced in February 2008, that she and Hart had separated. Hart subsequently appeared in the video for her 2008 song "So What",  which deals with their separation. The couple sought marriage counseling during their separation in hopes of reconciliation.  In February 2010, Pink confirmed that she and Hart were back together. Hart also appears with Pink in the music video for her songs "Just Give Me a Reason", "True Love" (both from her 2012 album The Truth About Love), and "Just Like Fire" (from the soundtrack to the 2016 film Alice Through the Looking Glass).

In November 2010, Pink announced on The Ellen DeGeneres Show that she and Hart were expecting their first child. In June 2011, she gave birth to their daughter. In December 2016, she gave birth to their second child, a son. Pink is a supporter of attachment parenting.

In 2010, she appeared on Forbes "The Celebrity 100" list at number 27, with earnings of $44 million. In 2011, she appeared on Forbes The Top-Earning Women in Music list at number 6 with earnings of $22 million, with an average of $1 million per show on the road. In 2009, Billboard put her number 6 on their "Money Makers" list, listing her earnings as $36,347,658. In 2013, she appeared on Forbes list of "Highest Paid Musicians", with earnings of $32 million. In 2018, she appeared on Forbes list of "Highest Paid Female Celebrities", with earnings of $52 million.

On April 4, 2020, amidst the COVID-19 pandemic, Pink announced that she and her three-year-old son, Jameson, showed symptoms for COVID-19 and she subsequently tested positive, but fully recovered. She also announced donations of $500,000 each to the Temple University Hospital Fund in Philadelphia, where her mother worked for nearly two decades, and the City of Los Angeles Mayor's Emergency COVID-19 Crisis Fund. She has had asthma her whole life, and the initial days of fighting the virus exacerbated her condition.

Awards and achievements

According to Nielsen SoundScan, Pink's record sales stand at 16 million copies in the United States. Pink has sold over 40 million albums and 50 million singles worldwide, making her one of the world's best-selling music artists.

Discography

 Can't Take Me Home (2000)
 Missundaztood (2001)
 Try This (2003)
 I'm Not Dead (2006) 
 Funhouse (2008)
 The Truth About Love (2012)
 Beautiful Trauma (2017)
 Hurts 2B Human (2019)
 Trustfall (2023)

Filmography

Tours
 Party Tour (2002)
 Try This Tour (2004)
 I'm Not Dead Tour (2006–2007)
 Funhouse Tour (2009)
 The Funhouse Summer Carnival (2010)
 The Truth About Love Tour (2013–2014)
 Beautiful Trauma World Tour (2018–2019)
 Summer Carnival (2023–2024)
 Trustfall Tour (2023)

See also

 List of animal rights advocates

References

Further reading

External links

 
 
 

 
1979 births
Living people
20th-century American singers
20th-century American women singers
21st-century American singers
21st-century American women singers
Activists from Philadelphia
Actresses from Philadelphia
American child singers
American contemporary R&B singers
American dance musicians
American mezzo-sopranos
American women pop singers
American women rock singers
American feminists
American people of German descent
American people of Irish descent
American people of Lithuanian-Jewish descent
American pop rock singers
American soul singers
American women writers
ARIA Award winners
Arista Records artists
Brit Award winners
Feminist musicians
Grammy Award winners
Jewish American musicians
Jewish singers
Jive Records artists
American LGBT rights activists
MTV Europe Music Award winners
Musicians from Philadelphia
People from Doylestown, Pennsylvania
RCA Records artists
Singers from Pennsylvania
Songwriters from Pennsylvania
World Music Awards winners
Writers from Philadelphia
You+Me members